Do Estakhr (also known as Do Sakhlī and Do Salkhī) is a village in Bagh Safa Rural District, Sarchehan District, Bavanat County, Fars Province, Iran. At the 2006 census, its population was 26, in 6 families.

References 

Populated places in Sarchehan County